Tangjiashan may refer to:

 Mount Tangjia, mountain in Sichuan, China
 Tangjiashan Lake, landslide dam-created lake formed by the 2008 Sichuan earthquake